Donnegy Seraino Fer (born on 9 January 1998), is a Surinamese football player who plays for Inter Moengotapoe and the Surinamese national team. He is the younger brother of Roxey Fer.

He started with his debut with his national youth team career in 2012 for the 2013 CONCACAF U-17 Championship in Panama, scoring his first international goal for Suriname against Guyana with a 3–1 victory in the qualifying stage.

On 13 October 2018, Fer made his senior debut and scored his first senior goal against the British Virgin Islands with a 5–0 victory.

International career

International goals
Scores and results list Suriname's goal tally first.

Honours

Club
Portmore United
RSPL: Winners 2018-2019

References

1998 births
Living people
Suriname international footballers
Association football forwards
Surinamese footballers
Suriname youth international footballers